Bottiglieri is an Italian surname. Notable people with the surname include:

Andrés Bottiglieri (born 1988), Argentine footballer
Emilio Bottiglieri (born 1979), Canadian soccer player
Matteo Bottiglieri (1684-1757), Italian sculptor and painter
Rita Bottiglieri (born 1953), Italian pentathlete

Italian-language surnames